9 Boötis is a single, variable star in the northern constellation of Boötes, located around 630 light years away from the Sun. It is visible to the naked eye as a faint, orange-hued star with a baseline apparent visual magnitude of 5.02. This object is moving closer to the Earth with a heliocentric radial velocity of −41 km/s.

This is an aging giant star with a stellar classification of K3 III, which indicates it has exhausted the hydrogen at its core and evolved of the main sequence. As a consequence, its outer atmosphere has swollen to 55 times the radius of the Sun. It is a suspected irregular variable that ranges in photographic magnitude from 6.1 down to 6.6. 9 Boötis is considered mildly lithium-rich with a moderate level of chromospheric activity. It is radiating 716 times the luminosity of the Sun from its enlarged photosphere at an effective temperature of 4,197 K.

References

K-type giants
Suspected variables
Irregular variables
Boötes
Durchmusterung objects
Bootis, 09
121710
068103
5247